Tate Britain's 2012 Turner Prize was awarded to video artist Elizabeth Price for her 2012 twenty-minute video installation The Woolworths Choir of 1979. The other nominees were Spartacus Chetwynd, video artist Luke Fowler, and visual artist Paul Noble.

The £25,000 prize was presented by Jude Law 3 December 2012 in a ceremony at Tate Britain. Elizabeth Price was the first pure video artist to win since Steve McQueen in 1999.

References

External links
 Turner Prize 2012, Tate Britain.

2012 Turner Prize

2012 art awards
2012 awards in the United Kingdom